Hendrik van Gent (14 September 1899, Pernis – March 29, 1947, Amsterdam) was a Dutch astronomer.

He moved to South Africa in 1928 in order to observe the southern sky at the Leiden Southern Station and the Union Observatory in Johannesburg. He obtained his PhD from Leiden University in 1931. He studied variable stars and also discovered three comets, namely C/1941 K1, C/1944 K2 and C/1943 W1. The Minor Planet Center credits him with the discovery of 39 numbered minor planets during 1929–1935.

He died of a heart attack at the age of 47 while on leave in the Netherlands. The crater Van Gent on the far side of the Moon, and the asteroid 1666 van Gent are named after him.

List of discovered minor planets

References 
 

 J.H. Oort, "In Memoriam Dr. H. van Gent", Hemel en Dampkring: Orgaan van de Nederlandse Vereniging voor Weer- en Sterrenkunde, 45 (1947), 159-160.
 W.H. van den Bos, "In Memoriam Dr. Hendrik van Gent", Monthly Notes of the Astronomical Society of South Africa, 6 (1947), 34-35.

1899 births
1947 deaths
Discoverers of asteroids
Discoverers of comets

Dutch expatriates in South Africa
20th-century Dutch astronomers
Leiden University alumni
Scientists from Rotterdam